The 2015 Internationaux de Strasbourg was a professional tennis tournament played on clay courts. It was the 29th edition of the tournament and will be part of the International-level tournament category of the 2015 WTA Tour. It took place in Strasbourg, France, on 17–23 May 2015.

Points and prize money

Point distribution

Prize money

Singles main draw entrants

Seeds 

 1 Rankings as of May 11, 2015.

Other entrants 
The following players received wildcards into the singles main draw:
  Jelena Janković
  Virginie Razzano
  Francesca Schiavone
  Samantha Stosur

The following players received entry from the qualifying draw:
  Gabriela Dabrowski
  Olga Govortsova
  Hsieh Su-wei
  Nadiia Kichenok
  Varvara Lepchenko
  Wang Qiang

The following player received entry as a lucky loser:
  Océane Dodin

Withdrawals 
Before the tournament
  Casey Dellacqua  →replaced by Shelby Rogers
  Jarmila Gajdošová →replaced by Lauren Davis
  Julia Görges →replaced by Océane Dodin
  Daniela Hantuchová  →replaced by Irina Falconi
  Kaia Kanepi  →replaced by Zheng Saisai
  Johanna Larsson  →replaced by Pauline Parmentier
  Peng Shuai →replaced by Aleksandra Krunić

During the tournament
  Madison Keys
  Lesia Tsurenko

Retirements 
  Mona Barthel
  Olga Govortsova
  Jelena Janković

Doubles main draw entrants

Seeds 

1 Rankings as of May 11, 2015.

Other entrants 
The following pair received a wildcard into the doubles main draw:
  Agata Barańska /  Victoria Muntean

Champions

Singles 

  Samantha Stosur def.  Kristina Mladenovic, 3–6, 6–2, 6–3

Doubles 

  Chuang Chia-jung /  Liang Chen def.  Nadiia Kichenok /  Zheng Saisai, 4–6, 6–4, [12–10]

External links 
 

2015 WTA Tour
2015
2015 in French tennis
May 2015 sports events in France